Silenus Calatinus (Σιληνός) was a Sicilian Greek historian of the 2nd century BC who wrote a history in Greek of Hannibal's campaign in Italy from 218 to 204BC. His work is known only from fragments and borrowings by other authors.

Silenus was probably a native of Caleacte in northern Sicily. Along with Sosylus of Lacedaemon he accompanied Hannibal during his campaign, and therefore was able to provide a contemporaneous, first-hand account. Lucius Coelius Antipater largely based much of his Latin history of the Second Punic War on Silenus; Polybius, Livy, and Cicero also referenced him.

References

Greek-language historians from the Roman Empire
Ancient Greek historians known only from secondary sources
Historians from Magna Graecia
People of the Second Punic War